June Renate Pedersen (born 3 April 1985) is a Norwegian former footballer who played as a defender. During her career, Pedersen won three caps for the Norway women's national football team.

Club career
In December 2005, Swedish national champions Umeå IK signed Pedersen from Norwegian second tier club IK Grand Bodø. She was a substitute in all four legs of Umeå's UEFA Women's Cup final defeats in 2007 and 2008. She was part of Umeå when the team won the 2007 Swedish Championship. With her playing opportunities decreasing at Umeå, Pedersen moved to Damallsvenskan rivals Piteå in December 2008. Pedersen was part of the Piteå team that won the Swedish Championship in 2018, the first in the club's history. In 2020, after ten years on the team, she left Piteå to join Hammarby Fotboll on a two-year contract with the option of an additional year.

International career
On 17 September 2015, she made her debut for the Norway senior national team during a match against Scotland at the age of 30. A week later, she earned her first start playing in the left-back position against Kazakhstan during Norway's first UEFA Women's Euro 2017 qualifying match. She has also played for the Sápmi women's national football team.

References

External links

 (archive)
 (archive)
June Pedersen at Piteå IF 

1985 births
Living people
Sportspeople from Tromsø
Damallsvenskan players
Elitettan players
Tromsdalen UIL players
IK Grand Bodø players
Umeå IK players
Piteå IF (women) players
Hammarby Fotboll (women) players
Norwegian women's footballers
Norway women's youth international footballers
Norway women's international footballers
Norwegian expatriate women's footballers
Expatriate women's footballers in Sweden
Norwegian expatriate sportspeople in Sweden
Women's association football defenders